Dan Ťok (born 4 March 1959) is a Czech politician and business manager who served as Minister of Transport from 2014 to 2019. He was nominated to the government by ANO 2011.

References

External links
Profile on the website of Ministry of Transport

1959 births
Living people
ANO 2011 Government ministers
People from Uherské Hradiště
Transport ministers of the Czech Republic
Members of the Chamber of Deputies of the Czech Republic (2017–2021)